Teddy O'Connor was a hurler.

Teddy O'Connor may also refer to:

Teddy O'Connor (Gaelic footballer)
Teddy O'Connor (horse)

Se also
Edward O'Connor (disambiguation)